See Amenemhat, for other individuals with this name.

Amenemhat I (Ancient Egyptian: Ỉmn-m-hꜣt meaning 'Amun is at the forefront'), also known as Amenemhet I, was a pharaoh of ancient Egypt and the first king of the Twelfth Dynasty of the Middle Kingdom.

Amenemhat I was probably the same as the vizier named Amenemhat who led an expedition to Wadi Hammamat under his predecessor Mentuhotep IV, and possibly overthrew him from power. Scholars differ as to whether Mentuhotep IV was killed by Amenemhat I, but there is no independent evidence to suggest this and there may even have been a period of co-regency between their reigns.

Amenemhat I was not of royal lineage, born to Senusret and Nefert who were possibly related to the nomarchial family of Elephantine. The composition of some literary works (the Prophecy of Neferti, the Instructions of Amenemhat) and, in architecture, the reversion to the pyramid-style complexes of the 6th dynasty rulers are often considered to have been attempts at legitimizing his rule. Texts from the period mention his mother being from the Upper Egyptian nome Ta-Seti. Many scholars in recent years have argued that Amenemhat I's mother was of Nubian origin.

Amenemhat I moved the capital from Thebes to Itjtawy and was buried in el-Lisht. He may have been assassinated.

Sources 
Amenemhat I's praenomen occupies the first entry of the third row of the Karnak King List from the Festival Hall of Thutmose III (c. 1479–1425 BC). In the Abydos king list from the temple of Seti I (c. 1290–1279 BC) in Abydos, Amenemhat I's praenomen Sehetep-ib-re occupies the  fifty-ninth entry. It must also have occupied the same position in the king list at the temple of Ramesses II (c. 1279–1213 BC) though it has been lost in a lacuna. In the Saqqara Tablet from the tomb of the chief lector priest and chief of works Tjuneroy, Amenemhat I's praenomen occupies the fifteenth entry. The Turin Canon partially preserves Amenemhat I's praenomen in the twentieth entry of the sixth column and accords him a reign of 29 years. The line immediately above mentions the 'kings of the residence of Iti-tawy'.

Amenemhat I is also mentioned in Manetho's Aegyptiaca, originally composed circa the 3rd century BC, tentatively dated to the reign of Ptolemy II. The original work is no longer extant, but has persisted through the writings of Josephus, Africanus, Eusebius, and George Syncellus. He is accorded a reign of 16 years under the name Άμμενέμης (romanized Ammenemês) by both Africanus and Eusebius, though he is placed at the end of the Eleventh Dynasty instead of at the start of the Twelfth. Syncellus accords him a reign of 26 years under the name Σταμμενέμης ά (romanized Stammenemês I) as the thirty-second king of Thebes.

Family

Origin 
Amenemhat I was the son of a Senusret and a Nefret, who were not of the royal family. His mother is attested to on an offering table that was found at Amenemhat I's pyramid at El-Lisht which also provides her title 'king's mother' and likely in the 'Prophecy of Neferty' in which she is identified as a woman from the Upper Egyptian nome of Ta-Seti. His father is attested to on a block from Karnak and held the title 'god's father'.

Relationship to Mentuhotep IV 
The relationship between Amenemhat I and his predecessors, particularly Mentuhotep IV, remains unclear, although he may be identical to the vizier Amenemhat under Mentuhotep IV that is mentioned in inscriptions from Wadi Hammamat. The inscriptions here record two prophetic events. The birth of a gazelle calf on the stone which became Mentuhotep IV's sarcophagus lid, and a sudden rainstorm that revealed a well brimming with water. The Egyptologist Gae Callender notes that, presuming the vizier and king to be identical, the report of these miracles were intended to 'signal that he was the one for whom miracles were performed' and indicated that he 'had been favoured by the gods'. There is also an inscription on a bowl from El-Lisht bearing the names of both kings. It led the Egyptologist William Murnane to propose that a period of co-regency was instantiated to legitimize Amenemhat I's accession to the throne, though the Egyptologist Nicolas Grimal considers the posited co-regency to be fictitious. Instead, the Egyptologist Wolfram Grajetzki believes it to indicate the respect Amenemhat I had for his predecessor. There are indicators of possible unrest attested to in texts from Deir el-Bersha possibly dating to the period that led to Amenemhat I's reign. There were also two other claimants – an Inyotef and a Sergeseni – that vied for the throne at this time.

Wife and children 
Amenemhat I had one presumed wife, a Neferitatjenen, who is known from a statuette of her son, presumed to be Senusret I. The statuette bore the inscription 'King Senusret born to King Amenemhat and born of the king's mother Neferitatjenen'. The statuette has since been lost, stolen from the Louvre in 1830. The name 'Neferitatjenen' is not otherwise known from the Middle Kingdom leading Grajetzki to question the accuracy of the transcription, and furthermore it may refer instead to the mother of Senusret II whose father was Amenemhat II. Amenemhat I had one known son, his successor on the throne Senusret I. Three of his daughters are also known: Neferu III who is attested to in the Story of Sinuhe and was the wife of Senusret I; and Neferusherit and Kayet who are named on artefacts found in Amenemhat I's pyramid complex.

Early reign 
There's some evidence that the early reign of Amenemhat I was beset with political turmoil, as indicated by the inscriptions of Nehri, a local governor. There were some naval battles where an associate of Amenemhat I by the name of Khnumhotep I was involved, and helped to procure victory. Later, Khnumhotep was appointed as an important local governor at Beni Hasan, and he founded a dynasty of local governors there. His grandson was Khnumhotep III.

In the inscriptions by Khnumhotep, mention is also made of military campaigns against the Asiatics and the Nubians.

Name 

Amenemhat I's name is associated with one of only two sebayt or ethical "teachings" attributed to Egyptian monarchs, entitled the Instructions of Amenemhat, though it is generally thought today that it was composed by a scribe at the behest of the king.

Amenemhat I's Horus name, Wehemmesu, which means renaissance or rebirth, is an allusion to the Old Kingdom period, whose cultural icons and models (such as pyramidal tombs and Old Kingdom artistic motifs) were emulated by the Twelfth Dynasty kings after the end of the First Intermediate Period. The cult of the king was also promoted during this period, which witnessed a steady return to a more centralized government.

Pyramid 

Amenemhat I built his pyramid (Ancient Egyptian: Swt-ḫꜥu Ỉmn-m-hꜣt meaning 'Cult places of Amenemhat's appearance') at El-Lisht. The pyramid had a core constructed from roughly hewn limestone blocks with gaps plugged with sand, debris, and mudbrick. Curiously, the core also contained relief-decorated blocks pilfered from the monuments of the Old Kingdom. The core was then encased by fine limestone blocks. The decision to use inferior materials may have arisen from economic and practical considerations. In particular, Faiyum has abundant clay deposits which could be sourced.

Before the pyramid, on its east side, lay the mortuary temple that carried its own name independent of the pyramid. In the Old Kingdom, mortuary complexes were given a single name. Amenemhat I broke with this tradition instead choosing to provide names for the individual components. The temple was named 'High [rises up] Amenemhat's beauty'. The temple was built on a lower level than the pyramid – perhaps in reference to the terraced mortuary temple of Mentuhotep II – and was of a smaller size compared against Old Kingdom temples. There are few remains of the temple preventing a detailed reconstruction, and only its courtyard has been properly investigated. It appears that the temple was rebuilt during the reign of Senusret I, as attested to by inscriptions bearing his name. There is no evidence of a cult pyramid extant, though the causeway and valley temple – which has not been investigated and is now buried under a local cemetery – have been identified. Within its perimeter wall are the grave sites of family members and officials. These include his mother, Nefret; wife, Neferitatjenen; and a daughter, Neferu; along with a vizier, Intefiqer.

Beneath the pyramid, entered from the north chapel, is the substructure. The north chapel contained a red granite false door, behind which lay the descending corridor. The pink granite lined corridor plugged with blocks leads to a square chamber with a shaft in its centre that leads to the burial chamber. This chamber has filled with ground water and has never been accessed.

Assassination 
Two literary works dating from the end of the reign give a picture about Amenemhat I's death. The Instructions of Amenemhat were supposedly counsels that the deceased king gave to his son during a dream. In the passage where he warns Senusret I against too great intimacy with his subjects, he tells the story of his own death as a reinforcement:

This passage refers to a conspiracy in which Amenemhat was killed by his own guards, when his son and co-regent Senusret I was leading a campaign in Libya. Another account of the following events is given in the Story of Sinuhe, a famous text of Egyptian literature:

Succession 

Amenemhat I is considered to be the first king of Egypt to have had a coregency with his son, Senusret I. A double dated stele from Abydos and now in the Cairo Museum (CG 20516) is dated to the Year 30 of Amenemhat I and to the Year 10 of Senusret I, which establishes that Senusret was made co-regent in Amenemhat's Year 20.

Officials 
There are few known officials from Amenemhat I's reign. The vizier Ipi is presumed to have held office during the middle of Amenemhat I's reign. He is known from his tomb TT 315 / MMA 516 at Deir el-Bahri. He held many offices and titles during his lifetime including those of treasurer, steward, and seal-bearer for the king of Lower Egypt. A further vizier datable to the reign is Intefiqer.

Two treasurers can be placed under this king: another Ipi and Rehuerdjersen. Two high stewards, Meketre and Sobeknakht, have also been identified.

Modern adaptation 
Naguib Mahfouz, the Nobel Prize-winning Egyptian novelist, includes Amenemhat I in one of his stories published in 1941 entitled "Awdat Sinuhi". The story appeared in an English translation by Raymond Stock in 2003 as "The Return of Sinuhe" in the collection of Mahfouz's short stories entitled Voices from the Other World.  The story is based directly on the "Story of Sinuhe", although adding details of a lovers' triangle romance involving Amenemhat I and Sinuhe that does not appear in the original.  Mahfouz also includes the pharaoh in his account of Egypt's rulers "Facing the Throne".  In this work, the Nobel laureate has the Ancient Egyptian gods judge the country's rulers from Pharaoh Mena to President Anwar Sadat.

See also 

Twelfth Dynasty of Egypt family tree
List of Egyptian pyramids
List of megalithic sites

Notes

References

Bibliography

Further reading 
Mahfouz, Naguib. The Return of Sinuhe in Voices from the Other World (translated by Robert Stock), Random House, 2003.

External links 
 Ancient-Egypt.org
 Amenemhet, Similarities between The Testament of Amenemhet and Machiavelli's Prince
 Hatshepsut: from Queen to Pharaoh, an exhibition catalog from The Metropolitan Museum of Art (fully available online as PDF), which contains material on Amenemhat I (see index)

 
Pharaohs of the Twelfth Dynasty of Egypt
20th-century BC Pharaohs
Viziers of the Eleventh Dynasty of Egypt
Ancient murdered monarchs
Male murder victims
Egyptian people of Sudanese descent